Wilfred Harry Bleaden (6 March 1887 – 30 August 1965) was a British athlete. He competed in the men's long jump at the 1908 Summer Olympics.

References

1887 births
1965 deaths
Athletes (track and field) at the 1908 Summer Olympics
British male long jumpers
Olympic athletes of Great Britain
Sportspeople from Aberdeen